Christine Ann Elder is an American diplomat who served as the United States Ambassador to Liberia from June 2016 to March 2020.

Early life and education
Elder is a native of Glasgow, Kentucky, the daughter of Allen and Diane Elder. She is a graduate of Glasgow High School and received a B.A. from the University of Kentucky and an M.A. from The George Washington University.

Career
Elder's  career has spanned both civil and foreign service.  She served as a Trade Policy Assistant with the International Trade Administration at the United States Department of Commerce before joining the United States Department of State. Her early assignments included ones in Germany and Hungary. She served as Senior Watch Officer in the State Department's Operations Center from 2005 to 2006 and as Deputy Director for Regional Affairs in the Bureau of Near Eastern Affairs from 2006 to 2007. Between 2007 and 2010 she held roles as Strategic Planning Officer in the Bureau of International Programs and Acting Deputy Coordinator for International Information Programs.

Elder served as Deputy Chief of Mission at the U.S. Embassy in Maputo, Mozambique from 2010 to 2013.

When Elder was tapped by President Obama to become ambassador she was the Director of the Office of Southern African Affairs at the Bureau of African Affairs at the U.S. Department of State, a position she had held since 2013.

Ambassador to Liberia
Elder was nominated by President Barack Obama on February 12, 2016, and was confirmed by the Senate on May 17, 2016. She was sworn in on June 20, 2016 and she presented her credentials to President Ellen Johnson Sirleaf on June 23, 2016. She left her post on March 21, 2020.

Personal
Elder is married to Paul Hughes, a former Foreign Service Officer, and has two step-children.

References

Year of birth missing (living people)
Living people
21st-century American diplomats
Ambassadors of the United States to Liberia
American women ambassadors
George Washington University alumni
Kentucky women in politics
Obama administration personnel
People from Chicago
United States Foreign Service personnel
University of Kentucky alumni
21st-century American women